Ángel Damián Sanzo Herrera (born in Antequera, 1973) is a Spanish pianist. He teaches at Badajoz's Conservatory.

Awards

Recordings
Rosa Miranda y Ángel Sanzo (Cambayá Records)

Notes

References
 Profile at the Asociación de Amigos de la Música de Alcoy
 Extremadura al día

External links 
Personal webpage
Music Proficiency Courses, Unicaja Foundation
Piano de la mano de Angel Sanzo - Spanish review
Angel Sanzo: "Nuestro conservatorio es de los más punteros de España" - Spanish interview (elPeriódico)
http://www.unia.es/images/stories/sede_baeza/Ordenacion_Academica_Baeza/perfeccmusical2009.pdf

Living people
1973 births
Spanish classical pianists
Male classical pianists
José Iturbi International Piano Competition prize-winners
21st-century classical pianists
21st-century male musicians
Spanish male musicians